Wink is a city in Winkler County, Texas, United States. The population was 940 at the 2010 census. Wink was a temporary childhood home to singer and songwriter Roy Orbison, although he was born in Vernon, Texas.   Orbison later described the major components of life in Wink as "football, oil fields, oil, grease and sand", and in later years expressed relief that he was able to leave the desolate town.

History
Wink began in 1926, when oil was discovered in Hendrick oilfield in Winkler County. By mid-1927, the Wink Townsite Company was selling lots in Horse Wells pasture of the T. G. Hendrick Ranch. The oil boom brought new people to Wink, causing a shortage of housing. Newcomers set up tents and built makeshift houses. Wink was originally named Winkler, Texas, for the county. When a post office was requested, postal authorities notified the applicant that a post office bearing that name already was in operation. The citizens shortened the name to Wink and received a post office in 1927. In that year, the first public school was organized, and a temporary building was constructed. A Sunday school was started by November 1927, and the population of the town was reported at 3,500. By 1929, that number climbed to 6,000. The actual population could have been around 10,000 to 25,000 people.

The boom brought lawlessness to Wink, including bootlegging, prostitution, and gambling. Even the city government, which was organized on June 4, 1928, came under the control of a well-organized underworld. On October 16, 1928, District Judge Charles Klapproth declared the incorporation election void, and the city government was reorganized. In December 1928, the first municipal building, a jail, was constructed. In 1929, the Texas-New Mexico Railroad built its tracks from Wink Junction to Wink, connecting the town to Monahans and New Mexico.

In the 1930s, the boom declined; the population hovered under 4,000, and the number of businesses fluctuated between 50 and 180. By 1933, the town was legally incorporated. Five hospitals and 15 doctors served injured oilfield workers, expectant mothers, and epidemic victims. Throughout the 1940s, the population continued to decline from 1,945 to 1,521, and the number of businesses decreased from 130 to 40.

In December 1947, Winkler County State Bank opened in Wink. Wink entered the 1950s with a stable community, including a population just over 1,500. The number of businesses varied in the decade from 25 to 50. In 1958, the railroad from Wink Junction to Wink was abandoned. During the early 1960s, the population rose to over 1,800, but dipped to under 1,200. By 1968, the number of businesses varied between 55 and 20.

In July 1960, the federal government approved an application by Wink for more than a million dollars in urban renewal funds to upgrade and rehabilitate  within the city limits of Wink. National attention focused on the small oil town, which used the money for paving and curb and gutter work.

The population continued to decline to under 1,200 in the 1970s and 1980s. In the late 1970s, the oil economy improved, but the number of businesses slipped to a low of five by the late 1980s. At the end of the 1980s, Wink operated on a limited budget, based on low tax rates. In 1990, Wink remained a small oil town with a population of 1,189. This had fallen to 919 by 2000, but the 2010 count indicated a slight rebound, with 940 citizens residing in Wink.

Geography
Wink is located at  (31.754497, 103.154117).

Climate
According to the NOAA's National Weather Service, Wink is often one of the hottest locations in the United States for daily maximum shade temperatures. Temperatures throughout the summer often are above 105 °F (41 °C) and readings above 110 °F (43 °C) occur every summer.

Demographics

2020 census

As of the 2020 United States census, there were 915 people, 314 households, and 262 families residing in the city.

2000 census
As of the census of 2000,  919 people, 341 households, and 260 families lived in the city. The population density was 809.1 people per square mile (311.3/km). The 437 housing units averaged 384.8 per square mile (148.0/km). The racial makeup of the city was 85.6% White, 0.9% African American, 0.3% Native American, 10.9% from other races, and 2.3% from two or more races. Hispanics or Latinos of any race were 23.1% of the population.

Of the 341 households, 42.5% had children under the age of 18 living with them, 60.2% were married couples living together, 12.0% had a female householder with no husband present, and 23.5% were not families. About 22.3% of all households were made up of individuals, and 11.1% had someone living alone who was 65 years of age or older. The average household size was 2.70 and the average family size was 3.15.

In the city, the population was distributed as 31.8% under the age of 18, 5.8% from 18 to 24, 28.5% from 25 to 44, 22.4% from 45 to 64, and 11.5% who were 65 years of age or older. The median age was 37 years. For every 100 females, there were 84.9 males. For every 100 females age 18 and over, there were 81.7 males.

Males had a median income of $32,266 versus $20,526 for females. The per capita income for the city was $15,888. About 10.0% of families and 14.0% of the population were below the poverty line, including 17.6% of those under age 18 and 20.8% of those age 65 or over.

Education
Wink is served by the Wink-Loving Independent School District.

All of Winkler County is zoned to Odessa College.

Notable people

 Roy Orbison, Singer/songwriter; grew up in Wink

In media 

 Cassie (Ari Graynor) one of the main characters of the show I'm Dying Up Here is from Wink.

Notes

References

Cities in Texas
Cities in Winkler County, Texas